VisualAudio is a project that retrieves sound from a picture of a phonograph record. It originated from a partnership between the Swiss National Sound Archives and the School of Engineering and Architecture of Fribourg.

Introduction 
Discs were the only means of preserving sound before the introduction of magnetic tapes. Until the advent of the vinyl in the 1950s, the records were made of shellac or wax. The organic composition of these materials enabled them to degrade over time and also made them prone to attack by fungi.

As a result, many records, including unique original radio productions, are in a state of deterioration which precludes play by traditional mechanical means, hence the interest in a non-contact approach.

History 
The idea of this recovery of the sound of old records through optical scanning started in the summer of 1999 in Lugano, among the technical manager of the Swiss National Sound Archives (Fonoteca Nazionale) Stefano S. Cavaglieri (creator and holder of the intellectual property, initiator of the project), the former director of M & C Management and Communications SA Pierre Hemmer (co-creator of the project), and the Director of the Swiss National Sound Archives Pio Pellizzari (co-creator of the project).

The Fribourg school of engineering and architecture (Hochschule für Technik und Architektur Freiburg) was the main partner, at first studying its feasibility and then starting a  project that progressed over years.

Principle 

During normal playback of a phonograph record, sound is obtained by a stylus following the groove.
The radial displacement of the groove is observable through a microscope which means that sound information is visible.

If a high-resolution analog picture of each side of the record is taken and the information in the film is then digitised using a circular scanner, various algorithms can process the image in order to extract and reconstruct the sound.

Method

Photography 

A central part of the process is photo shooting. It is performed at the beginning of the process on a properly cleaned record, in order to archive it as a film. 

The photographic film has a high resolution of 600 lines per mm. This resolution is sufficient to accurately follow the groove displacement.

Scanning process 

Once the record content is stored on a photographic film, the next step is to recover the original sound. The University of Applied Sciences of Fribourg built a scanner prototype to do this.   
The  current version of the scanner is made of a glass rotating plate, on which is placed the film. The digitisation of the image is done by a linear CCD camera of 2048 pixels wide, which takes pictures at regular intervals, with frequencies ranging from 25,000 to 200,000 lines per rotation. The combination of the camera with the rotating film delivers a rotary scan of the record in the form of a rectangular picture of a ring. A second radial movement provides the next ring.

Image processing 

Once digitized, the images are processed to analyze and determine the positions and displacement of the groove. The first step is to correct the imperfections of the captured images. Many disturbances can come from various stages of the acquisition process: the record itself (cracks, scratches, dust), the photography (film grain), or the scanning (dust, optics, CCD sensors). 

Then, the groove position is estimated using edge detection algorithms. Once the edges are detected, corrections requiring more complex knowledge about the structure of the image are carried out. Some examples of corrections:
 Interpolation if the groove is interrupted
 If an edge of the groove is damaged, the information provided by the other side of the groove is useful

Sound extraction 

The final step is converting groove displacement into an audible signal. This signal is processed by band-pass filters in order to obtain only the bandwidth of the original recording. Some frequency equalizations (for instance RIAA) are implemented.

This project aims to retrieve and archive the sound as close as possible to the original one. By default, audio restoration is not applied.

Broken records 
The ultimate goal of this project is getting sound out of an otherwise forever lost record.

Many records from the 1940s are cracked and definitely unplayable. The result is an interesting jigsaw puzzle.
As the cracks are due to the shrinkage of the lacquer, there is no material loss in most of the cases. To solve this problem, in November 2006, the Swiss National Sound Archives started a project funded by the Gebert Rüf Foundation. The results so far are encouraging. The algorithm basically uses signal features to determine whether two groove parts are contiguous or not.

The project is still in a test validation phase, but some sound is already available.

System quality 

Reaching the same quality as good as an original record replayed on a modern turntable is probably unrealistic. Originally around 20 dB in the early prototype, the signal-to-noise ratio of modern system is situated around 19 dB for a good 78 rpm record.

Advantages and disadvantages

With its intermediate photographic stage, this solution solves several significant challenges found in archiving systems.
 Speed of the archiving process, because of the relatively short time for the photo-shooting.
 The storage of information occurs on an analog film so it is not reliant on a technology that could become quickly obsolete and the freezing and storing of the record's state in a new format allows the retrieval of the information later using new technologies.
 The periodic transfer to new data storage media is avoided because the photographic film has a life span of several hundred years.
 The possibility of using the system for vertical cut records.

Disadvantages of the system:
 Not usable for wax cylinders
 Some irregularities such as rounded or bulging records, which do not affect play on a traditional turntable, can influence the sound of VisualAudio.

Recovered files 
Among the unique audio files recovered with such techniques, the speech of Italian politician and poet Aldo Spallicci.

See also
Laser turntable
IRENE (Image, Reconstruct, Erase Noise, Etc.) technology

References

Sources

External links 
 
 

Mass digitization
Digital preservation